Brendan Thomas Malone (born April 21, 1942) is an American basketball coach.

Early life
Malone grew up in Astoria, Queens in New York City and graduated from Rice High School. Malone's father, also named Brendan, unloaded freight cars for the Railway Express Agency.  Malone then attended Iona College. He played only one game in 1960 for the Iona Gaels men's basketball team and graduated with a bachelor's degree in 1962.

Coaching career
After graduating from Iona, Malone then became a CYO basketball coach for the Church of the Most Precious Blood, Queens  then became junior varsity basketball coach at Power Memorial Academy in 1967. Malone also enrolled at New York University and graduated with a master's degree in physical education in 1968. From 1970 to 1976, Malone was varsity basketball coach at Power Memorial and led Power Memorial to two city championships. During his six-season stint, Malone earned three "Coach of the Year" honors.

Malone was named an assistant coach at Fordham on April 5, 1976. He also served in a similar capacity at the collegiate level with Yale (1977–1978), and Syracuse (1978–1984 under Jim Boeheim) before becoming head coach at Rhode Island from 1984 to 1986. 

Malone then got his first NBA coaching job as an assistant for the New York Knicks in 1986 and served two seasons in the staffs of head coaches Hubie Brown, Bob Hill, and Rick Pitino. In 1988, Malone joined the Detroit Pistons as an assistant coach under Chuck Daly. Malone stayed in Detroit until 1995 and also coached under Ron Rothstein in the 1992–93 season and Don Chaney from 1993 to 1995. Malone helped coach the Pistons to the 1989 and 1990 NBA championship titles.

Malone was named as the first head coach (1995–96) of the Toronto Raptors, one of two 1995 NBA expansion teams in Canada. Malone was appointed the job by the Raptors' general manager of the time, Isiah Thomas. Malone was long considered the NBA's leading authority on defending Michael Jordan, particularly after orchestrating Detroit Piston defenses that kept Jordan's Bulls out of the NBA Finals for some time.  Malone only lasted one season as head coach of the Raptors, going 21–61, but handed the championship Bulls one of their few losses that season.  Following his time with the Raptors, Malone served as an assistant coach with the Indiana Pacers, New York Knicks, Detroit Pistons and as a consultant with the Seattle SuperSonics. He was the interim head coach of the Cleveland Cavaliers in 2004–05.

On July 3, 2007, Malone was one of four assistants hired to serve under new Orlando Magic head coach Stan Van Gundy. On June 25, 2013, he was hired as an assistant coach for the Sacramento Kings, under new head coach Mike Malone, his son, who himself was hired earlier that month. However, on October 23, 2013, his resignation was announced, with the "rigors of coaching in the NBA" cited as the reason. On May 30, 2014, Malone was one of three assistants hired to serve under new Detroit Pistons head coach Stan Van Gundy.

Head coaching record

College

NBA

|- 
| style="text-align:left;"|Toronto
| style="text-align:left;"|
|82||21||61|||| style="text-align:center;"|8th in Central||—||—||—||—
| style="text-align:center;"|Missed Playoffs
|- 
| style="text-align:left;"|Cleveland
| style="text-align:left;"|
|18||8||10|||| style="text-align:center;"|4th in Central||—||—||—||—
| style="text-align:center;"|Missed Playoffs
|- class="sortbottom"
| style="text-align:left;"|Career
| ||100||29||71|||| ||—||—||—||—

References

External links
 Basketball-Reference.com: Brendan Malone

1942 births
Living people
American expatriate basketball people in Canada
American men's basketball coaches
American men's basketball players
Basketball coaches from New York (state)
Basketball players from New York City
Catholics from New York (state)
Cleveland Cavaliers assistant coaches
Cleveland Cavaliers head coaches
College men's basketball head coaches in the United States
Detroit Pistons assistant coaches
Fordham Rams men's basketball coaches
High school basketball coaches in the United States
Indiana Pacers assistant coaches
Iona Gaels men's basketball players
New York Knicks assistant coaches
New York University alumni
Orlando Magic assistant coaches
People from Astoria, Queens
Rhode Island Rams men's basketball coaches
Sportspeople from Queens, New York
Syracuse Orange men's basketball coaches
Toronto Raptors head coaches
Yale Bulldogs men's basketball coaches